Runcu Salvei is a commune in Bistrița-Năsăud County, Transylvania, Romania. It is composed of a single village, Runcu Salvei, and was part of Salva Commune until 2005, when it was split off.

References

Communes in Bistrița-Năsăud County
Localities in Transylvania